Andres Hernández may refer to:
 Andres Hernández (boxer), Puerto Rican boxer
 Andrés Hernández Ros, Spanish politician
 Andrés Hernández (footballer), Venezuelan footballer